The 2019 Tahiti Championship competition was the 46th season of the Tahitian domestic rugby union club competition operated by the Fédération Polynésienne de Rugby (FPR).

Teams

Number of teams by regions
All but one team this season are from Papeete or suburbs of the Papeete Urban Area.

Competition format
The top four teams at the end of the regular season (after all the teams played one another once) enter a knockout stage to decide the Champions of Tahiti.  This consists of two rounds. The semi-finals, with the losers meeting for 3rd place and with the winners meeting in the final at the Stade Fautaua in Pirae.

Tahiti's bonus point system operates as follows:

 4 points for a win.
 2 points for a draw.
 1 point for a loss.
 No point for a forfeit.
 1 bonus point for scoring at least 4 tries (or more).
 1 bonus point for losing by 7 points (or fewer).

Table

References

Rugby union competitions
Tahiti
Rugby union in Tahiti
Tahiti